Zhanyi District is a district of the city of Qujing, Yunnan province, China.

Administrative divisions
Zhanyi District has 4 subdistricts, 2 towns and 5 townships. 
4 subdistricts

2 towns
 Baishui
 Panjiang
5 townships

Transport
Zhanyi is served by the Shanghai-Kunming and Pan County West Railways.

References

External links
Zhanyi County Official Website

County-level divisions of Qujing